Cotignola is a comune (municipality) in the Province of Ravenna in the Italian region Emilia-Romagna, located about  southeast of Bologna and about  west of Ravenna.

Cotignola was the birthplace of the 15th century condottiero Muzio Attendolo, whose family Sforza) later ruled Milan, Pesaro and other seigniories in Italy. The other condottiero Alberico da Barbiano was born in the frazione of Barbiano.

Cotignola borders the following municipalities: Bagnacavallo, Bagnara di Romagna, Faenza, Lugo, Solarolo. It is mentioned for the first time in 919 (as Cotoniola) and was later the fief of the counts of Cunio, who had a castle in Barbiano. In the 15th century it was ruled by the Sforza, then by the Este and, from 1598, it was part of the Papal States.

During the late stages of World War II, Cotignola was near the front line over the Senio river. Eighty percent of the urban buildings were destroyed by the Allied bombings, with some 270 civilian casualties.

Twin towns
 Hüttlingen, Germany, since 2007
 Delle, France, since 2012
   Beer-Yaakov, Israel, since 2022

References

External links
 Official website

Cities and towns in Emilia-Romagna